According to the Hebrew Bible, the Tablets of the Law (also Tablets of Stone, Stone Tablets, or Tablets of Testimony; Biblical Hebrew: לוּחֹת הַבְּרִית lûḥōt habbǝrît "tablets of the covenant", לֻחֹת הָאֶבֶן lūḥōt hāʾeben or לֻחֹת אֶבֶן lūḥōt eben or לֻחֹת אֲבָנִים lūḥōt ʾăbānîm "stone tablets", and לֻחֹת הָעֵדֻת lūḥōt hāʿēdūt "tablets of testimony", Arabic: أَلْوَاحُ مُوسَى) were the two stone tablets inscribed with the Ten Commandments when Moses ascended Mount Sinai as written in the Book of Exodus.

According to the biblical narrative, the first set of tablets, inscribed by the finger of God, were smashed by Moses when he was enraged by the sight of the Children of Israel worshiping a golden calf and the second were later chiseled out by Moses and rewritten by God.
 
According to traditional teachings of Judaism in the Talmud, the stones were made of blue sapphire as a symbolic reminder of the sky, the heavens, and ultimately of God's throne. Many Torah scholars, however, have opined that the biblical sapir was, in fact, lapis lazuli (see , lapis lazuli is a possible alternate rendering of "sapphire" the stone pavement under God's feet when the intention to craft the tablets of the covenant is disclosed ).

Appearance of the tablets

In recent centuries the tablets have been popularly described and depicted as round-topped rectangles but this has little basis in religious tradition. According to rabbinic tradition, they were rectangles, with sharp corners, and indeed they are so depicted in the 3rd century paintings at the Dura-Europos Synagogue and in Christian art throughout the 1st millennium, drawing on Jewish traditions of iconography.

The rounded tablets appear in the Middle Ages, following in size and shape contemporary hinged writing tablets for taking notes (with a stylus on a layer of wax on the insides). For Michelangelo and Andrea Mantegna they  still have sharp corners (see gallery), and are about the size found in rabbinic tradition. Later artists such as Rembrandt tended to combine the rounded shape with the larger size. While, as mentioned above, rabbinic tradition teaches that the tablets were squared, according to some authorities, the Rabbis themselves approved of rounded depictions of the tablets in replicas so that the replicas would not exactly match the historical tablets.

According to the Talmud, each Tablet was square, six Tefachim (approximately 50 centimeters, 20 inches) wide and high, and more a thicker block than a tablet, at three Tefachim (25 centimeters, 10 inches) thick, though they tend to be shown larger in art. (Other Rabbinic sources say they were rectangular rather than square, six Tefachim high and three wide and deep.) Also according to tradition, the words were not engraved on the surface, but rather were bored fully through the stone.

Christian replicas

Replicas of the tablets, known as tabots or sellats, are a vital part of the practice of Ethiopian Orthodox Church, which claims that the original Ark of the Covenant is kept in the Church of Our Lady Mary of Zion in Axum.

In the Quran

The Quran states that tablets were given to Moses, without quoting their contents explicitly:
"And We wrote for him on the tablets [something] of all things – instruction and explanation for all things, [saying], 'Take them with determination and order your people to take the best of it. I will show you the home of the defiantly disobedient.

These tablets are not broken in the Quran, but picked up later:
"And when Moses returned to his people, angry and grieved, he said, 'How wretched is that by which you have replaced me after [my departure]. Were you impatient over the matter of your Lord?' And he threw down the tablets and seized his brother by [the hair of] his head, pulling him toward him. [Aaron] said, 'O son of my mother, indeed the people overpowered me and were about to kill me, so let not the enemies rejoice over me and do not place me among the wrongdoing people.. 
"And when the anger subsided in Moses, he took up the tablets; and in their inscription was guidance and mercy for those who are fearful of their Lord.".

Gallery

See also
 World's largest book, a stone book the pages of which are inscribed stone tablets

References

Ten Commandments
Hebrew Bible objects
Ark of the Covenant